Harischandrudu is a 1980 Telugu, Political drama film. The film was directed by U. Visweswar Rao. Jayachitra surprisingly sang a song in her own voice for herself MUTHUMANTA.

Awards
National Film Awards
National Film Award for Best Feature Film in Telugu - 1980

References 

1980 films
Films scored by T. Chalapathi Rao
1980s Telugu-language films
Best Telugu Feature Film National Film Award winners